Juan Behrensen (27 April 1904 – 13 August 1981) was an Argentine swimmer. He competed in the men's 4 × 200 metre freestyle relay event at the 1924 Summer Olympics.

References

External links
 

1904 births
1981 deaths
Argentine male swimmers
Olympic swimmers of Argentina
Swimmers at the 1924 Summer Olympics
Sportspeople from Santa Fe, Argentina
Argentine male freestyle swimmers
20th-century Argentine people